La Puerta is a village in Catamarca Province, Argentina. It is the head of the Ambato Department.

External links

Populated places in Catamarca Province